Setolebia is a genus of beetles in the family Carabidae, containing the following species :

 Setolebia caligata  — Russia (Far East), China (Jiangxi) 
 Setolebia kmecoi  — China (Yunnan)
 Setolebia legorskyi  — China (Yunnan)
 Setolebia nubatama  — Japan
 Setolebia sterbai  — China (Yunnan)

References

Lebiinae